PackageForge is a commercial graphical installation and packaging software tool for Symbian OS based smartphones. PackageForge allows developers to graphically create software installation packages that can be installed to a Symbian OS based phone. After installation a user can start using the installed software application.

PackageForge works by providing a graphical interface towards the Symbian package definition files (.pkg). The developer provides information about the package, like the vendor, package name, version and what application files to include. After the package has been defined, the package is compiled and built into a Symbian installation file (.sis) which is then ready to be uploaded to the Nokia OVI store or for direct installation on a phone.

The SIS installation files are used for installing Flash Lite, Python for S60, Symbian C/C++ or Qt for Symbian applications.

Most Notable Features

Wizards for creating different package types
Compatibility with makesis/signsis and Carbide.c++ development environment
Localization support for multilingual packages
One-click build and sign of a package
Graphical management of software and device dependencies
User-friendly build log

See also
.sis
Symbian OS
List of installation software

References

External links
Official homepage
Tools for creating Symbian installation packages
Symbian software installation & packaging documentation

Symbian OS